Godfrey Khotso Mokoena (born 6 March 1985 in Heidelberg, South Africa) is a South African athlete who specializes in the long jump and triple jump.

Early life and family
He started his school education at Shalimar Ridge Primary School in Heidelberg, Gauteng. He excelled at gymnastics at a very early age.

He matriculated at Nigel High School, Nigel. His talent at long jump was discovered by Elna de Beer. He started to compete in athletics at the age of 13.

Career 
Originally competing in the triple jump, winning the World Junior title in 2004 (he also came second in the long jump) and the silver medal at the 2006 Commonwealth Games, he switched to long jump in 2007 after an ankle injury. It was a very successful transition. In 2008, he won the long jump at the world indoor championships and silver at the Olympic games.

In July 2009, he set a new African record in long jump, 8.50m in Madrid in an IAAF Super Grand Prix meeting where he finished second behind Fabrice Lapierre. The previous African record, 8.46, was held by Cheikh Toure of Senegal and set in 1997.

For the 2014 Commonwealth Games, he switched back to the triple jump, winning the gold medal.

Achievements

Personal bests
Long jump – 8.50 m (2009) Triple jump – 17.35 m (2005) NR'''
High jump – 2.10 m (2001)

Family pesponse
Phakiso Mokoena, father of Godfrey, was quoted in a local newspaper "Godfrey initially found it difficult to qualify for the Olympics, but has through hard work endured and finished second in the world."

References

1985 births
Living people
People from Lesedi Local Municipality
South African Sotho people
South African male long jumpers
South African male triple jumpers
Athletes (track and field) at the 2004 Summer Olympics
Athletes (track and field) at the 2008 Summer Olympics
Athletes (track and field) at the 2012 Summer Olympics
Athletes (track and field) at the 2016 Summer Olympics
University of Pretoria alumni
Olympic athletes of South Africa
Olympic silver medalists for South Africa
Athletes (track and field) at the 2006 Commonwealth Games
Athletes (track and field) at the 2014 Commonwealth Games
Commonwealth Games gold medallists for South Africa
Commonwealth Games silver medallists for South Africa
Commonwealth Games medallists in athletics
World Athletics Championships medalists
Medalists at the 2008 Summer Olympics
World Athletics Championships athletes for South Africa
Olympic silver medalists in athletics (track and field)
African Games silver medalists for South Africa
African Games medalists in athletics (track and field)
African Games bronze medalists for South Africa
Olympic male triple jumpers
Athletes (track and field) at the 2003 All-Africa Games
Athletes (track and field) at the 2007 All-Africa Games
Diamond League winners
World Athletics Indoor Championships winners
South African Athletics Championships winners
Sportspeople from Gauteng
Medallists at the 2006 Commonwealth Games
Medallists at the 2014 Commonwealth Games